The angstrom or ångström is a metric unit of length equal to  m; that is, one ten-billionth (US) of a metre, a hundred-millionth of a centimetre, 0.1 nanometre, or 100 picometres. Its symbol is Å, a letter of the Swedish alphabet. The unit is named after the Swedish physicist Anders Jonas Ångström (1814–1874). 

The angstrom is often used in the natural sciences and technology to express sizes of atoms, molecules, microscopic biological structures, and lengths of chemical bonds, arrangement of atoms in crystals, wavelengths of electromagnetic radiation, and dimensions of integrated circuit parts. The atomic (covalent) radii of phosphorus, sulfur, and chlorine are about 1 angstrom, while that of hydrogen is about 0.5 angstroms. Visible light has wavelengths in the range of 4000–7000 Å.

In the late 19th century, spectroscopists adopted  of a metre as a convenient unit to express the wavelengths of characteristic spectral lines (monochromatic components of the emission spectrum) of chemical elements. However, they soon realized that the definition of the metre at the time, based on a material artifact, was not accurate enough for their work.  So, around 1907 they defined their own unit of length, which they called "Ångström", based on the wavelength of a specific spectral line. It was only in 1960, when the metre was redefined in the same way, that the angstrom became again equal to  metre. 

Even though it is a decimal power fraction of the metre, the angstrom was never part of the SI system of units, and it has been increasingly replaced by the nanometre or picometre.  Up to 2019, it was listed as a compatible unit by both the International Bureau of Weights and Measures (BIPM) and the US National Institute of Standards and Technology (NIST), but it is not mentioned in the 9th edition of the official SI document, the "BIPM Brochure" (2019) or in the NIST version of the same.

The 8th edition of the BIPM brochure (2006) and the NIST guide 811 (2008) used the spelling ångström, with Swedish letters; however, this form is rare in English texts. Some popular US dictionaries list only the spelling angstrom. 

The accepted symbol is "Å", no matter how the unit is spelled. However, "A" is often used in less formal contexts or typographically limited media.

History

It subsequently spread to the fields of astronomical spectroscopy, atomic spectroscopy, and then to other sciences that deal with atomic-scale structures.

Although intended to correspond to  metres, that definition was not accurate enough for spectroscopy work. Until 1960 the metre was defined as the distance between two scratches on a bar of platinum-iridium alloy, kept at the BIPM in Paris in a carefully controlled environment. Reliance on that material standard had led to an early error of about one part in 6000 in the tabulated wavelengths. Ångström took the precaution of having the standard bar he used checked against a standard in Paris, but the metrologist Henri Tresca reported it to be so incorrect that Ångström's corrected results were more in error than the uncorrected ones.

In 1892–1895, Albert A. Michelson and Jean-René Benoît, working at the BIPM with specially developed equipment, determined that the length of the international metre standard was equal to  times the wavelength of the red line of the emission spectrum of electrically excited cadmium vapor. In 1907, the International Union for Cooperation in Solar Research (which later became the International Astronomical Union) defined the international angstrom as precisely 1/6438.4696 of the wavelength of that line (in dry air at 15 °C (hydrogen scale) and 760 mmHg under a gravity of 9.8067 m/s2).

This definition was endorsed at the 7th General Conference on Weights and Measures (CGPM) in 1927, but the material definition of the metre was retained until 1960.  From 1927 to 1960, the angstrom remained a secondary unit of length for use in spectroscopy, defined separately from the metre. In 1960, the metre itself was redefined in spectroscopic terms, which allowed the angstrom to be redefined as being exactly 0.1 nanometres.

Although still widely used in physics and chemistry, the angstrom is not a formal part of the International System of Units (SI). The closest SI unit is the nanometre. The International Committee for Weights and Measures officially discouraged its use, and does not even mention it in the 9th edition of the official standard (2019).  The angstrom is also not included in the European Union's catalogue of units of measure that may be used within its internal market.

Angstrom star

After the redefinition of the meter in spectroscopic terms, the Angstrom was formally redefined to be 0.1 nanometers.  However, there was briefly thought to be a need for a separate unit of comparable size defined directly in terms of spectroscopy.  In 1965, J.A. Bearden defined the Angstrom Star (symbol: Å*) as 0.202901 times the wavelength of the tungsten  line. This auxiliary unit was intended to be accurate to within 5 parts per million of the version derived from the new meter.  Within ten years, the unit had been deemed both insufficiently accurate (with accuracies closer to 15 parts per million) and obsolete due to higher precision measuring equipment.

Symbol

For compatibility reasons, Unicode includes the formal symbol at U+212B (ANGSTROM SIGN; HTML entity "&angst;", "&#x0212B;", or "&#8491;"), which is deprecated. The angstrom sign is normalized into U+00C5 (LATIN CAPITAL LETTER A WITH RING ABOVE; HTML entity "&Aring;", "&#xC5;", or "&#197;"). The Unicode consortium recommends to use the latter.

Before digital typesetting, the angstrom (or angstrom unit) was sometimes written as "A.U.". This use is evident in Bragg's paper on the structure of ice, which gives the c- and a-axis lattice constants as 4.52 A.U. and 7.34 A.U., respectively. Ambiguously, the abbreviation "a.u." may also refer to the atomic unit of length, the bohr—about 0.53 Å—or the much larger astronomical unit (about ).

See also
  (for objects on this scale)
 Conversion of units
 X unit

References

External links

Non-SI metric units
Units of length